In the city of Ottawa, Ontario, Canada, a ward is an electoral district within a municipality used in local politics. Wards are named after neighbourhoods, thoroughfares, parishes, landmarks, geographical features and in some cases, historical figures connected to the area, and numbered. There are 23 wards in Ottawa.

Current wards

Former wards

References